The Colombia Championship is a golf tournament on the U.S.-based Korn Ferry Tour. It was first played in 2010 at The Country Club of Bogotá in Bogotá, Colombia. The 2020 purse was US$700,000, with $126,000 going to the winner.

Winners

Bolded golfers graduated to the PGA Tour via the Korn Ferry Tour regular-season money list.

Notes

External links
Coverage on the Korn Ferry Tour's official site

Korn Ferry Tour events
Golf tournaments in Colombia
Recurring sporting events established in 2010
2010 establishments in Colombia